Gagarin, or Gagarina (feminine; Гагарина), is a Russian surname derived from the word gagara, meaning loon (a waterbird, genus Gavia). Notable people with the surname include:
Gagarin family, a Rurikid princely family
Anna Gagarina, maiden name of Anna Lopukhina (1777–1805), mistress of Emperor Paul of Russia
Ivan Gagarin (1814-1882), Russian Jesuit theologian 
Nikolai Gagarin (1784–1842), Russian soldier and politician
Grigory Gagarin (1810–1893), Russian painter, major general and administrator
Polina Gagarina (born 1987), Russian singer, songwriter, actress, and model
Andrey Gagarin (1934–2011), Russian prince and scientist
Yekaterina Gagarina (1790–1873), wife of Russian diplomat Prince Grigory Gagarin and the daughter of the Secretary of State Pyotr Soymonov
Yuri Gagarin (1934–1968), Russian cosmonaut, the first man to travel in space

Russian-language surnames